Rudolf "Rudi" Opitz (1908–1939) was a German lithographer, Nazi Party opponent and victim.

His name appears on the Rudi-Opitz-Straße, a service road (Anliegerstraße) in the de:Gohlis district of Leipzig. The Gohlis tram depot (Straßenbahnhof) was named Jugendbahnhof „Rudi Opitz“ from 1950 to 1994.

From 1992 to 2004, Mittelschule „Rudi Opitz“ was the official, but seldom-used, name of the 94th School (Middle School), Schulgebäude Miltitzer Weg 3, de:Grünau, Leipzig. To 1992, Rudi-Opitz-Oberschule has been the official name of the previous polytechnic high school at the same location.

References

External links
Leipzig Lexikon (André Loh-Kliesch)

German engravers
German activists
Assassinated activists
1908 births
1939 deaths
German lithographers
German people who died in Buchenwald concentration camp
20th-century lithographers
20th-century engravers